Digraičiai (formerly) is a village in Kėdainiai district municipality, in Kaunas County, in central Lithuania. According to the 2011 census, the village had a population of 9 people. There are a magazin (an old warehouse), an underground water monitoring station, a place of the former manor.

At the beginning of the 20th century there were Digraičiai village and estate.

Demography

Images

References

Villages in Kaunas County
Kėdainiai District Municipality